The 30th Michigan Infantry Regiment was an infantry regiment that served in the Union Army during the American Civil War.

Service
The 30th Michigan Infantry was organized at Detroit, Michigan and mustered into Federal service on January 9, 1865.

The regiment served as garrison of the Detroit and St. Clair Rivers on the border with Canada and saw no service in the field.

The regiment was mustered out on June 30, 1865.

Total strength and casualties
The regiment suffered 18 enlisted men who died of disease, for a total of 18
fatalities.

Commanders
 Colonel Grover Salman Wormer

See also
List of Michigan Civil War Units
Michigan in the American Civil War

Notes

References
The Civil War Archive

Units and formations of the Union Army from Michigan
1865 disestablishments in Michigan
1865 establishments in Michigan
Military units and formations established in 1865
Military units and formations disestablished in 1865